Zactane is the trade name of two different drugs:
 Famotidine, a histamine H2-receptor antagonist that inhibits stomach acid production
 Ethoheptazine, an opioid analgesic